Cans may refer to:
 the plural of can (see Can (disambiguation))
 a colloquial term for headphones that enclose the ears
 the ISO 15924 code of the Canadian Aboriginal syllabics
 the surname of:
 Joacim Cans, Swedish musician
 an acronym for:
Childhood acute neuropsychiatric symptoms
Complaints of the arm, neck, and shoulder

See also 
 Festival de Cans, a Spanish film festival
 Cans-et-Cévennes, a French commune
 Cannes, a city in France
 Julius D. Canns
 Kans